Velké Chvojno (until 1948 České Chvojno; , 1940–1945 Kahn über Bodenbach) is a municipality and village in Ústí nad Labem District in the Ústí nad Labem Region of the Czech Republic. It has about 900 inhabitants.

Administrative parts
Villages of Arnultovice, Luční Chvojno, Malé Chvojno, Mnichov and Žďár are administrative parts of Velké Chvojno.

Geography
It is located mostly in the Central Bohemian Uplands.

History
The first written mention of Velké Chvojno is from 1352, when it was part of the Krupka estate. It was probably founded in the 13th century. However, the oldest part of today's municipality is the village of Žďár, which was first mentioned in 1227.

Sights
The most notable building of the municipality is the Church of All Saints in Arnultovice. It was originally a late Gothic church, first mentioned in 1352. It 1798, the church was rebuilt in the Baroque style and was enlarged.

Notable people
Georg Ritschel (1616–1683), Protestant minister and educator

References

External links

Villages in Ústí nad Labem District